Daniel, Fred & Julie is an album by Canadian musicians Daniel Romano, Frederick Squire and Julie Doiron, released December 1, 2009 on You've Changed Records.

The album consists predominantly of traditional folk songs, with the exception of two original songs written by Romano. It was recorded in the garage of Squire's home over the summer of 2009. "Down by the Weeping Willow" is a version of the folk song commonly known as "Jealous Lover".

Track listing
 "The Gambler and His Bride" (7:12)
 "Runner" (3:46)
 "I Dream of Jeanie" (3:11)
 "No One Knew My Name" (1:54)
 "Hallelujah, I'm a Bum" (2:56)
 "Down by the Weeping Willow" (4:14)
 "Bonny Black Bess" (3:55)
 "Clementine" (3:42)
 "Your Love" (4:08)
 "Johnny Sands" (1:31)

References

2009 albums
Julie Doiron albums
Frederick Squire albums
Daniel Romano albums